Cerebral infarction is the pathologic process that results in an area of necrotic tissue in the brain (cerebral infarct). It is caused by disrupted blood supply (ischemia) and restricted oxygen supply (hypoxia), most commonly due to thromboembolism, and manifests clinically as ischemic stroke. In response to ischemia, the brain degenerates by the process of liquefactive necrosis.

Classification
There are various classification systems for cerebral infarcts, some of which are described below.
 The Oxford Community Stroke Project classification (OCSP, also known as the Bamford or Oxford classification) relies primarily on the initial symptoms. Based on the extent of the symptoms, the stroke episode is classified as total anterior circulation infarct (TACI), partial anterior circulation infarct (PACI), lacunar infarct (LACI) or posterior circulation infarct (POCI). These four entities predict the extent of the stroke, the area of the brain affected, the underlying cause, and the prognosis.
 The TOAST (Trial of Org 10172 in Acute Stroke Treatment) classification is based on clinical symptoms as well as results of further investigations; on this basis, a stroke is classified as being due to (1) thrombosis or embolism due to atherosclerosis of a large artery, (2) embolism of cardiac origin, (3) occlusion of a small blood vessel, (4) other determined cause, (5) undetermined cause (two possible causes, no cause identified, or incomplete investigation).

Symptoms

Symptoms of cerebral infarction are determined by the parts of the brain affected. If the infarct is located in the primary motor cortex, contralateral hemiparesis is said to occur. With brainstem localization, brainstem syndromes are typical: Wallenberg's syndrome, Weber's syndrome, Millard–Gubler syndrome, Benedikt syndrome or others.

Infarctions will result in weakness and loss of sensation on the opposite side of the body. Physical examination of the head area will reveal abnormal pupil dilation, light reaction and lack of eye movement on opposite side. If the infarction occurs on the left side brain, speech will be slurred. Reflexes may be aggravated as well.

Risk factors
Major risk factors for cerebral infarction are generally the same as for atherosclerosis. These include high blood pressure, diabetes mellitus, tobacco smoking, obesity, and dyslipidemia. The American Heart Association/American Stroke Association (AHA/ASA) recommends controlling these risk factors in order to prevent stroke. The AHA/ASA guidelines also provide information on how to prevent stroke if someone has more specific concerns, such as sickle-cell disease or pregnancy. It is also possible to calculate the risk of stroke in the next decade based on information gathered through the Framingham Heart Study.

Pathophysiology
Cerebral infarction is caused by a disruption to blood supply that is severe enough and long enough in duration to result in tissue death. The disruption to blood supply can come from many causes, including:
 Thrombosis (obstruction of a blood vessel by a blood clot forming locally)
 Embolism (obstruction due to an embolus from elsewhere in the body),
 Systemic hypoperfusion (general decrease in blood supply, e.g., in shock)
 Cerebral venous sinus thrombosis.
 Unusual causes such as gas embolism from rapid ascents in scuba diving.

Even in cases where there is a complete blockage to blood flow of a major blood vessel supplying the brain, there is typically some blood flow to the downstream tissue through collateral blood vessels, and the tissue can typically survive for some length of time that is dependent upon the level of remaining blood flow. If blood flow is reduced enough, oxygen delivery can decrease enough to cause the tissue to undergo the ischemic cascade. The ischemic cascade leads to energy failure that prevents neurons from sufficiently moving ions through active transport which leads the neurons to first cease firing, then depolarize leading to ion imbalances that cause fluid inflows and cellular edema, then undergo a complex chain of events that can lead to cell death through one or more pathways.

Diagnosis
Computed tomography (CT) and MRI scanning will show damaged area in the brain, showing that the symptoms were not caused by a tumor, subdural hematoma or other brain disorder. The blockage will also appear on the angiogram. In people who die of cerebral infarction, an autopsy of stroke may give a clue about the duration from the infarction onset until the time of death.

Treatment
In the last decade, similar to myocardial infarction treatment, thrombolytic drugs were introduced in the therapy of cerebral infarction. The use of intravenous rtPA therapy can be advocated in patients who arrive to stroke unit and can be fully evaluated within 3 hours of the onset.

If cerebral infarction is caused by a thrombus  occluding blood flow to an artery supplying the brain, definitive therapy is aimed at removing the blockage by breaking the clot down (thrombolysis), or by removing it mechanically (thrombectomy). The more rapidly blood flow is restored to the brain, the fewer brain cells die. In increasing numbers of primary stroke centers, pharmacologic thrombolysis with the drug tissue plasminogen activator (tPA), is used to dissolve the clot and unblock the artery.
Another intervention for acute cerebral ischaemia is removal of the offending thrombus directly. This is accomplished by inserting a catheter into the femoral artery, directing it into the cerebral circulation, and deploying a corkscrew-like device to ensnare the clot, which is then withdrawn from the body. Mechanical embolectomy devices have been demonstrated effective at restoring blood flow in patients who were unable to receive thrombolytic drugs or for whom the drugs were ineffective, though no differences have been found between newer and older versions of the devices. The devices have only been tested on patients treated with mechanical clot embolectomy within eight hours of the onset of symptoms.

Angioplasty and stenting have begun to be looked at as possible viable options in treatment of acute cerebral ischaemia. In a systematic review of six uncontrolled, single-center trials, involving a total of 300 patients, of intra-cranial stenting in symptomatic intracranial arterial stenosis, the rate of technical success (reduction to stenosis of <50%) ranged from 90 to 98%, and the rate of major peri-procedural complications ranged from 4-10%.  The rates of restenosis and/or stroke following the treatment were also favorable.  This data suggests that a large, randomized controlled trial is needed to more completely evaluate the possible therapeutic advantage of this treatment.

If studies show carotid stenosis, and the patient has residual function in the affected side, carotid endarterectomy (surgical removal of the stenosis) may decrease the risk of recurrence if performed rapidly after cerebral infarction. Carotid endarterectomy is also indicated to decrease the risk of cerebral infarction for symptomatic carotid stenosis (>70 to 80% reduction in diameter).

In tissue losses that are not immediately fatal, the best course of action is to make every effort to restore impairments through physical therapy, cognitive therapy, occupational therapy, speech therapy and exercise.

Permissive hypertension - allowing for higher than normal blood pressures in the acute phase of cerebral infarction - can be used to encourage perfusion to the penumbra.

References

External links 

Stroke